Dmitri Yurievich Sitak (born 4 March 1983) is a Russian tennis player playing on the ATP Challenger Tour. On November 17, 2003, he reached his highest ATP singles ranking of World No. 356, whilst his highest doubles ranking of 138 was reached on March 22, 2010. He is the older brother of Artem Sitak, who is also a tennis player. Sitak was the first player that future world number one player Daniil Medvedev beat as a professional, when in March 2011 Medvedev won their match at an ITF Futures event in Russia.

Challenger finals

Doubles: 3 (2–1)

References

External links
 
 

1983 births
Living people
Russian male tennis players
People from Orenburg
Universiade medalists in tennis
Universiade gold medalists for Russia
Medalists at the 2005 Summer Universiade
Sportspeople from Orenburg Oblast